Aleksei Lvovich Nikolayev (born 12 January 1985) is a Russian former professional football player.

Club career
He made his debut for the senior squad of PFC CSKA Moscow on 29 March 2003 in a Russian Premier League Cup game against FC Zenit Saint Petersburg.

External links
 

1985 births
Sportspeople from Rostov-on-Don
Living people
Russian footballers
Association football midfielders
PFC CSKA Moscow players
FC Asmaral Moscow players
FC SKA Rostov-on-Don players
FC Taganrog players
FC Armavir players
FC Chayka Peschanokopskoye players